Takamatsu Castle may refer to:

Takamatsu Castle (Bitchū) situated in Bitchū province, (present-day Okayama, Okayama Prefecture), besieged in 1582
Takamatsu Castle (Sanuki) in Sanuki province, in Takamatsu, Kagawa Prefecture, on Shikoku, is also called Tamamo Castle